Keykhosravi (also Romanized as Keykhosravī; also known as Keykhosrayī) is a village in Qaleh Asgar Rural District, Lalehzar District, Bardsir County, Kerman Province, Iran. At the 2006 census, its population was 111, in 29 families.

References 

Populated places in Bardsir County